Caldwell Township is one of eighteen townships in Callaway County, Missouri, USA.  As of the 2010 census, its population was 438.

History
Caldwell Township was established on June 5, 1883, created from former portions of current adjacent townships (as of 2018), and named in honor of a local family.
The township's boundaries changed between 1883 and 1897, per descriptions of boundaries in the 1884 Missouri State Library history of Callaway County and the subsequent official map of the county published in 1897.

Geography
It contains seven cemeteries: Bush, Caldwell, Cave, Foster, James, Knight and Mount Tabor; as well as the streams of Caldwell Branch, Prairie Fork and Prime Creek.

References

 USGS Geographic Names Information System (GNIS)

External links
 US-Counties.com
 City-Data.com

Townships in Callaway County, Missouri
Jefferson City metropolitan area
Townships in Missouri